Araki is a nearly extinct language spoken in the small island of Araki (locally known as ), south of Espiritu Santo Island in Vanuatu. Araki is gradually being replaced by Tangoa, a language from a neighbouring island.

Current situation
Araki was estimated to have 8 native speakers in 2012 with ongoing language shift towards the neighboring language Tangoa. The rest of the island's population have a passive knowledge of Araki, allowing them to understand it, but having limited ability to speak it. A large portion of the Araki vocabulary, as well as idiosyncratic syntactic and phonetic phenomena of the language have been lost. The pidgin Bislama is spoken by many speakers of Araki as a lingua franca, though its use is mainly in the two towns of the country, Port-Vila and Luganville, and seldom in rural areas.

Araki was described in 2002 by the linguist Alexandre François.

Classification
Araki belongs to the Oceanic branch of Austronesian languages; more precisely, to the group ‘North and Central Vanuatu languages’.

Phonology
Araki has a phonological inventory of 16 consonant phonemes and 5 vowels, which are shown in the following two tables:

Consonants
Araki has 16 consonants which generally appear at the beginning of a syllable, with some exceptions. 

Only fluent speakers of Araki distinguish between the flap  and the trill ; and only they can distinguish and pronounce the linguolabial consonants. 'Passive' users of the language replace these consonants either with bilabial consonants or alveolar consonants. Although many younger people claim to be able to speak Araki, they are usually passive speakers, and therefore do not use linguolabial consonants.

Vowels
The vowel phonemes are:

Araki does not possess phonemic long vowels. Also, the language does not have phonemic diphthongs. However, strings of consecutive vowels are possible - indeed prevalent - in the language. In these cases, each vowel builds a separate syllable.

Syllable structure and stress
Most syllables in Araki are open (CV). Diachronic effects of word stress have led to the irregular loss of some syllables, and the creation of new phonotactic patterns of CVC and CCV, with many word-final consonants. Although a cluster of more than two consonants is impossible within a word, longer consonant clusters may appear in longer linguistic sequences.

Word stress in Araki normally falls on the penultimate syllable, at least when the last syllable of the word is of the form -(C)V. A secondary stress may be heard on every second syllable toward the left of the word. Stress is assigned only after the lexeme has received all its affixes to form the whole phonological word. A process of final high vowel deletion (which is common in Vanuatu languages) does not affect the stress rule.

Writing System

Grammar
Araki syntax can be divided into an open set of lexemes, including nouns, adjectives, verbs, adjuncts, adverbs, numerals and demonstratives; and a closed set of morphemes, which are often monosyllabic clitics or affixes.

Word order
The constituent order in Araki is strictly subject–verb–object (SVO). There is a clear formal boundary between the direct object - always internal to the predicate phrase, whether incorporated or not - and the oblique arguments: adverbs, prepositional phrases and indirect objects, which always appear outside the verb phrase.

Nouns
As in many Oceanic languages, not only verbs but also nouns (as well as other syntactic categories) are predicative in Araki. Nouns differ from verbs in being directly predicative, which means that they do not have to be preceded by a subject clitic. Also, only nouns are able to refer directly to entities of the world, and make them arguments entering into larger sentence structures.

Syntactically speaking, a noun can be either the subject of a sentence, the object of a transitive verb or the object of a preposition, all syntactic slots which are forbidden to verbs or adjectives. Proper names - place names and personal names - can be said to belong to the global category of nouns in Araki.

Noun-phrase structure
Contrary to many languages of Vanuatu, Araki did not retain the noun article *na of Proto Oceanic, nor any other obligatory noun determiner. As a consequence, a noun root on its own can form a valid NP in a sentence.

A Noun Phrase must have a head - this can be a noun, an independent pronoun or certain demonstratives. an adjective cannot be a NP-head, but needs the support of the empty head mada. All other elements are optional. A maximal NP should follow the following order of constituents, most of which are optional:

 an article: plural dai, partitive re, definite va;
 a noun or the empty head mada, or a 'possessive bundle', formed by {possessed noun + (a possessive classifier +) a possessor};
 an adjective;
 the anaphoric marker di 
 a demonstrative word
 a numeral preceded by a subject clitic (usually mo), similar to a clause;
 a relative clause; 
 a prepositional phrase.

It is rare to meet more than three or four elements in one NP.

Articles and reference-tracking devices
Semantically speaking, a noun without an article can be specific as well as non-specific, and definite as well as indefinite. Moreover, not only is there no gender-distinction, but even number is most of the time under-specified; only the context, and partly the personal marker on the verb, help distinguish between singular and plural reference.

Several devices are available - though always optional - in Araki to help track the reference of a particular NP. These are the clitics va, di, mada, dai, re, mo hese, which appear as shown in the above list.

The pro-clitic va and the post-clitic di both mark anaphoric relations. va is placed immediately before the noun, and codes for discourse-internal anaphora (that is, reference to a term that has already been introduced in the earlier context). di immediately follows the noun, and seems to refer to the immediate context preceding it (comparable with the English anaphoric use of 'this').

The construction {va N di} does not exist. This indicates that the two clitics must have different uses.

The empty head mada can be found at the beginnings of NPs. It never occurs alone, but is always followed by an adjective or a place name. Its role is to refer to a set of human individuals defined by the next word, in a similar way to English 'one' in the small one(s). mada can be described as a personal nominalizer. It does not involve definiteness or number.

The plural marker dai makes explicit the plurality of the NP, which is otherwise never coded for, and often left implicit. As all other markers mentioned in this section, it too is optional.

The specific indefinite mo hese, a numeral quantifier meaning 'one', is very commonly, if not obligatorily, used when a referent is introduced for the first time into the discourse. mo hese may be used as a numerical predicate, contrasting with other numbers, but it is most frequently used as a kind of article following the NP in order to mark it as being indefinite, that is, newly introduced into the discourse.

The partitive–indefinite pro-clitic re is used when the NP refers to a new, non-specific instance of a notion. In order to understand this concept, compare the English sentences 'I ate a banana ' with 'I want to eat a banana '. Besides being indefinite in both cases, in the first sentence a banana is specific, because it refers to a specific banana; in the second sentence a banana is non-specific, because it can refer to any banana, not one in particular. Although this semantic difference is not grammaticalized in English, it is in Araki, using re as a marker for non-specific indefinite reference.

The function of the aforementioned reference-tracking devices can be summarized as follows:

Verbs
Verbs are predicative words, which are preceded by subject clitics. Unlike nouns, they cannot form a direct predicate (that is, without a clitic), and cannot refer to an entity, nor form the subject of a sentence. They cannot directly modify a noun by just following it. From the semantic point of view, verbs refer to actions, events or states. Each verb in Araki must be marked with either Realis or Irrealis mood.

The only obligatory elements of a verb phrase are the head and the subject clitic. This can be extended not only to phrases headed by a verb, but also to phrases headed by an adjective or a numeral. Under certain conditions, a noun can also be the head of a so-called 'VP', provided that it is endowed with mood-aspectual properties, such as negation.

From a syntactic point of view, Araki contrasts intransitive with transitive verbs.

Intransitive verbs
Intransitive verbs never take either object NPs or transitive suffixes.

They are morphologically unvarying (that is, receive no morphological markings).

Transitive verbs
Transitive verbs take object arguments, as NPs and/or as object suffixes. Most transitive (or transitivised) verbs, though not all of them, can be morphologically marked as such. This usually implies the presence of a transitivity suffix -i and/or of an object personal suffix.

Some verbs can be described as having oblique transitivity, since they are usually followed by an oblique (generally, prepositional) complement.

Araki does not normally allow for ditransitive verbs. Where English would have two direct objects, as in I'll give you some money, Araki would have one complement as a direct object, while the other would be assigned the oblique case. Therefore, one complement appears inside the VP and the other outside it.

Symmetrical verbs
Some verbs in Araki allow its syntactic subject to be marked with either the case role of Patient or Agent.

However, this phenomenon is more limited in Araki than it is in English.

Verb serialization
Araki allows two verb roots to appear in one single verb phrase, thus forming a sort of complex verb {V1, V2}; usually no more than two verbs can appear at a time. This series of two verbs share one mood-subject clitic and the same aspect markers. This does not imply that they semantically have the same subject. No object or other complement can insert between these two verbs. The transitivity suffix -i, as well as the object suffix, appear on the right of the second verb, provided this is authorized by the morphology of V2 and by the syntactic context.

Verb serialization is much rarer in Araki than in many other Oceanic languages. It seems to be productive only when either of the two verbs is a movement verb. Another less seldom pattern, is when the second element is a stative verb or an adjective: V2 indicates the manner of V1.

A much more frequent strategy in Araki is that of clause chaining.

Personal markers
In the case of Araki, it is more appropriate to discuss ‘personal markers’ (rather than ‘pronouns’). There are seven morphosyntactic person markings: first, second, third, and in the case of non-singular first person, there is an inclusive/exclusive distinction.

Independent pronouns

Subject clitics and person markers
The following table shows the clitics that provide ordinary marking of subjects in verbal sentences. They express two moods: realis and irrealis.

Whether the mood is coded as realis or irrealis depends on the modality of the verb phrase.

Numerals
Numerals behave syntactically like (intransitive) verbs, and could be argued to form a subset of verbal lexemes. They must always be introduced by a subject clitic, which is sensitive to person and modality (Realis/Irrealis).

Cardinal numbers
Numerals are listed in the following table:

Ordinal numbers
Ordinal numbers are formed with the prefix ha-, at least for the numbers 2-5. Greater numbers have already integrated this - or a similar - prefix ha- to their radical.

The number 'one' has a suppletive form mudu 'first'.

The ordinal forms are used especially with the word dan(i), to form the days of the weeks:

Adjectives
Contrary to many languages which lack a distinct category of adjectives, Araki does have a set of lexemes which can be named this way. The lexical category of adjectives is defined by two basic principles: 
 adjectives can be predicates, and in this case must be preceded by a subject clitic, like numerals or verbs;
 adjectives can modify directly a noun in a Noun Phrase, without a subject clitic (opp. numerals) or a relative structure (opp. verbs).

Adjectives always follow the noun they modify, and come before numerals.

Adjuncts
Adjuncts form quite a small category of lexical items whose syntactic position is to follow immediately the verb radical, though still within the verb phrase. When the verb is transitive, adjuncts are inserted between the verb radical and the transitiviser suffix and/or the object suffixes, as though they were incorporated:

Adverbs
Contrary to adjuncts, which are always incorporated into the verb phrase, adverbs never are. They can appear either at the beginning or at the end of a clause. The unmarked position of a (non-typical) adverb is after the verb–object bundle, where prepositional phrases are too. The category of adverbs includes all words which form directly - that is, without a preposition - an oblique complement.

Demonstratives
Demonstratives are associated either to nouns for reference tracking, or have the whole clause as their scope. Although they syntactically behave partially like locational adverbs, demonstrative words form a specific paradigm, which is easily identified morphologically.

Reduplication
Araki uses reduplication in order to present a notion as intense, multiple or plural in one way or another. Semantically, verbal reduplication triggers features such as non-referentiality/genericity of the object, and thus is generally associated with noun incorporation. Reduplication is also the main device, if not the only one, which allows a word to change its syntactic category. Reduplication occurs: 
 From noun to noun (indicating plurality, and sometimes a diminutive capacity ('Many Ns, 'small Ns'). e.g. naru 'son' → nanaru 'sons', hudara 'dirt' → hudahudara 'small particles of dirt'
 From noun to verb or adjective (referring not to an of the world, but to a process/state which is normally caused by it). e.g. alo 'sun' → aloalo 'to be sunny'
 From verb to verb (deriving one of the following: an intensified meaning, plurality, reflexivity, distributivity, imperfectivity, detransitivity). e.g. v̈ano 'walk' → v̈anov̈ano 'race'
 From verb to noun (referring to the very notion of the verb, in general terms)e.g. sodo 'talk; → sodosodo 'speech, message, language'.

Structurally, Araki has three types of reduplication

CV reduplication
The first syllable of the word is reduplicated.
naru    → nanaru    ('son', 'sons')
lokudo  → lolokudo  ('angry')
levosai → lelevosai ('intelligent')

CVCV reduplication
The first two syllables of the word are reduplicated.
m̈arahu → m̈aram̈arahu ('fear', 'be afraid')
veculu → vecuveculu ('colour')
hudara → hudahudara ('dirt', 'small particles of dirt')

Root reduplication
The entire root of the word is reduplicated.
dev̈e → dev̈edev̈e ('pull')
alo  → aloalo   ('sun', 'to be sunny')
sodo → sodosodo ('talk', 'speech, message, language')

Clause structure
As mentioned above, Araki is a strict SVO language. This means that different sentence types, such as assertives, imperatives and interrogatives do not involve a change in word order. This, contrary to what occurs in European languages. These sentence types may differ in other ways.

Imperatives
All imperative sentences take Irrealis modality, by definition, since they refer to virtual events. The verb must be preceded by its subject clitic. 

Thus, except for prosody, all imperative sentences are formally identical with sentences expressing an intent or a near future (for example, 'you should help me' or ' you are going to help me').

A negative order does not use the usual negation marker ce, but the modal clitic kan 'Prohibitive':

Interrogatives
Interrogative sentences can take either Realis or Irrealis modality. 
Yes/No questions are similar to the corresponding question, except for prosody. 
Quite often, the interrogative is marked by a final tag ... vo mo-ce-re ... 'or not?'.  
In WH-questions, the interrogative words take the same slot as the word they replace (that is, they remain in-situ.

Arakian Interrogative words include sa 'what', se 'who', v̈e 'where', gisa 'when', and visa 'how many'. The interrogative article ('what X, which') is sava, a longer form of sa. It comes before a noun, for example sava hina 'what thing'. Two interrogative words are derived from sa 'what': sohe sa 'like what → how' and m̈ara sa 'because of what → why'.

Negation
The general negation marker is a single morpheme ce, which is used in all negative sentences except imperative. It always comes at the beginning of the predicate phrase, following the subject clitic. It can be combined to Realis or Irrealis mood.

The negation ce combines with other elements, for example aspect markers, to build complex negative morphemes. For example, 
 Negation ce + aspect le 'again' → 'no longer'
 Negation ce + aspect m̈isi 'still' → 'not yet'
 Negation ce + partitive re 'some' → 'not any'
 Negation ce + NP re hina 'some thing' → 'nothing'
 Negation ce + adverb n-re-dan 'on some day' → 'never'

The combination {negation re + Verb + partitive re in object position}, has the frequent effect of implying the non-existence of this object. The construction {ce re + N} has been grammaticalised into a complect predicate ce re, meaning 'do not exist, not to be'.

Existential sentences
Since the combination ce re has generalized to form a negative existential predicate, one could expect that, in a second stage of evolution, affirmative existential sentences (that is, 'there is N') would simply use the same predicate re without the negation. In fact, this is normally impossible. 
 
Affirmative existential sentences never use re, but have to employ other strategies. These include the use of the predicate mo hese 'one', or a locative phrase.

Complex sentences

Coordination
Coordination as a clause-linker is far from being widespread in Araki: clause-chaining is by far the preferred strategy. Nevertheless, some coordinators exist, whose meaning is more precise than just 'and'.

The most frequent coordinator is pani ~ pan 'and, but', which usually carries an adversive meaning: 

The word for 'or' is voni ~ von ~ vo.
 
M̈ara 'because' can be said to have coordinating effects.

Frequent use is made of the Bislama coordinator 'ale (derived from the French allez). Possible meanings are 'OK; then; now; so; finally'.

NP coordination 'X and Y' can be translated into Araki in three different ways: 
 the noun-like preposition nida- 'with';
 the comitative suffix -n(i), only with free pronouns;
 the numeral rolu 'three → and', with personal pronouns.

Conditional systems
Araki has three markers corresponding to English 'if': vada, aru, code. Surprisingly, two of these three markers are compatible with Realis modality.

 Co de 'suppose, let us say that → if' is the only marker that is incompatible with Realis modality. It can refer to a possible situation in the future, or it can present a counter-factual hypothesis about the present.
 Aru appears only with Realis modality in the conditional clause (the main clause may bear Realis or Irrealis marking). It can refer either to a possible hypothesis about the future, or to a counter-factual situation in the past.
 Vada is a common subordinator in Araki, probably deriving etymologically from the root vadai 'say, tell'. When used in a topic clause, vada is most often associated to Realis mood. It can refer either to a single event in the past (English 'when'), to a generic event in the global situation (English 'whenever'), or to a possible event in the future (English 'when', 'if', 'in case').

Clause chaining
Clause chaining is the combination of at least two clauses (C1 and C2), without any coordinator, subordinator or any other kind of overt link between them. On prosodic criteria, no pause is audible at their boundary, at least no such pause as between two autonomous sentences. Contrary to verb serialization, every verb must be preceded by its own subject clitic, whether or not it refers to the same subject as the preceding verb. A sentence like the following is perfectly common in Araki: 

Notice the ambiguity of the sentence: it is only the context that makes clear that what falls down is actually the stone, not the man. The high frequency of clause chaining constructions makes the clitic mo (Third person Realis, singular or plural) by far the most frequent word encountered in actual discourse.

Clause chaining can be used to describe a wide variety of situations: 
 Time succession and consequence;
 Two phases of a single complex action;
 Simultaneity of two events;
 Commenting on an action;
 Spatial dynamics;
 Temporal dynamics;
 Sentential objects;
 Relative clauses;
 Numeral phrases.

Unusual characteristics
Araki is one of the few languages of Vanuatu, and indeed of the world, that has a set of linguolabial consonants.

Araki lacks a row of voiced stops, as well as prenasalised stops, both of which are prevalent in the Oceanic language group.

Araki has an unusually high number of phonemic differentiation on the alveolar point of articulation. Particularly notable is the existence of a contrast between the alveolar trill and the alveolar flap one.

Language preservation
In June 2008, the Jacques Chirac Foundation for Sustainable Development and Cultural Dialogue announced its intention to focus on preserving the Araki language. This language is cited as an example, among many others, of the situation of language endangerment which the Chirac Foundation aims at addressing, especially through its programme “Sorosoro: Pour que vivent les langues du monde”. Sorosoro is itself an Araki word, meaning “breath, speech, language”.

Notes and references

Notes

References

Bibliography
 
.

External links
 Audio recordings in the Araki language, in open access, by A. François (source: Pangloss Collection, CNRS).
 Araki – English – French online dictionary by A. François.
 Araki wordlist at the Austronesian Basic Vocabulary Database.
 Alphabet and pronunciation

R:Realis:Realis mood
Irr:Irrealis:Irrealis mood
OBJ:Object:Object (grammar)

Critically endangered languages
Endangered Austronesian languages
Endangered languages of Oceania
Espiritu Santo languages
Languages of Vanuatu